"Last Train to Clarksville" is a song by American rock band the Monkees. It was released as the band's debut single on August 16, 1966, and was later included on the group's self-titled album, which was released on October 10, 1966. The song, written by Tommy Boyce and Bobby Hart, was recorded at RCA Victor Studio B in Hollywood on July 25, 1966, and was already on the Boss Radio "Hit Bounds" playlist on August 17, 1966. The song topped the Billboard Hot 100 on November 5, 1966. Lead vocals were performed by the Monkees' drummer, Micky Dolenz. "Last Train to Clarksville" was featured in seven episodes of the band's television series, the most for any Monkees song.

Composition
The song was written by the songwriting duo of Tommy Boyce and Bobby Hart. Boyce has said that the song's opening guitar part (played by Louis Shelton) was an attempt to emulate the type of memorable and clearly identifiable riff that the Beatles had used in songs such as "I Feel Fine", "Day Tripper" and "Paperback Writer". The latter Beatles' song had reached number one on the U.S. charts three months earlier, around the time that "Last Train to Clarksville" was written and recorded. The lyrics too were inspired by "Paperback Writer": Hart misheard the end of that song on the radio and thought Paul McCartney was singing "take the last train"; Hart then decided to use the line himself, after he found out that McCartney was actually singing "paperback writer."

Hart knew that the Monkees' TV series was being pitched as a music/comedy series in the spirit of the Beatles' film A Hard Day's Night, and he was hoping that by emulating the Beatles the song might become a successful single. He included a rhythmic lyric, and wrote in the "Oh No-No-No, Oh No-No-No" lyrics as a response to the Beatles' famous, "Yeah Yeah Yeah," from "She Loves You".

The lyrics tell of a man phoning the woman whom he loves, urging her to meet him at a train station in Clarksville before he must leave, possibly forever. There is no explicit reference to war in the song, but its last line, "And I don't know if I'm ever coming home," was an indirect reference to a soldier leaving for the Vietnam War. Hart has denied any connection by the song to the city of Clarksville, Tennessee, near Fort Campbell, Kentucky, the home of the 101st Airborne Division that was then serving in Vietnam. According to Hart, "We were just looking for a name that sounded good. There's a little town in northern Arizona I used to go through in the summer on the way to Oak Creek Canyon called Clarkdale. We were throwing out names, and when we got to Clarkdale, we thought Clarksville sounded even better. We didn't know it at the time, [but] there is an Army base near the town of Clarksville, Tennessee — which would have fit the bill fine for the storyline. We couldn't be too direct with the Monkees. We couldn't really make a protest song out of it—we kind of snuck it in."

Although Clarksville, a common location name in the U.S., is in the song's title, the video accompanying the song on the Monkees' TV show depicts a sign pointing to Clarkesville, a much less common spelling now used only for a single town in Georgia; other communities of that name have been either abandoned or renamed.

Recording
Boyce and Hart's band, Candy Store Prophets, performed the instrumental session work on the recording.

B-side
The single's B-side, "Take a Giant Step," later appeared as the closing track on Side 1 of the Monkees' debut album. Micky Dolenz performed lead vocals.

The song is presented as a plea to a heartbroken girl to move on from her past romantic disappointments and to "learn to live again at last" by "taking a giant step outside your mind." Critic Eric Lefcowitz describes the song as "proto-psychedelic."

Reception
Of "Last Train to Clarksville", Billboard remarked that "all the excitement generated by the promotion campaign for the new group...is justified
by this debut disk loaded with exciting teen dance beat sounds."  Cash Box said that it is "a hard-driving, pulsating romantic wailer with catchy repeating riff."

Personnel 

 Micky Dolenz – lead vocal
 Peter Tork and Davy Jones – backing vocals
 Tommy Boyce – acoustic guitar
 Louie Shelton – lead guitar
 Wayne Erwin and Gerry McGee – electric guitars
 Larry Taylor – bass
 Billy Lewis – drums
 Gene Estes – percussion
 Tommy Boyce, Bobby Hart – producers

Chart performance

Weekly charts

Year-end charts

References

External links
  (US)
  (UK)

1966 debut singles
1966 songs
The Monkees songs
American country music songs
Billboard Hot 100 number-one singles
Cashbox number-one singles
Country rock songs
RPM Top Singles number-one singles
Song recordings produced by Bobby Hart
Song recordings produced by Tommy Boyce
Songs about telephone calls
Songs about trains
Songs of the Vietnam War
Songs written by Bobby Hart
Songs written by Tommy Boyce